Luputa is a city of the Democratic Republic of the Congo.  It is located in Lomami Province. As of 2012, it had an estimated population of 39,875.

References 

Populated places in Lomami